Pierre Benoit may refer to:
  (1794–1852), French scientist and architect who relocated to Argentina
Pierre Benoit (novelist) (1886–1962), novelist and member of the Académie française
Pierre-Basile Benoit (1837–1910), member of the Canadian House of Commons
Pierre Benoit (MLA) (1824–1870), member of the Legislative Assembly of Quebec
Pierre Benoit (theologian) (1906–1987), Dominican priest, theologian and archaeologist in Jerusalem
Pierre Benoit (Ontario politician) (born c. 1939), former mayor of Ottawa
Pierre Benoit (Malecite) (died 1786), Malecite Indian who was murdered by settlers in York County, New Brunswick